Troy Anthony DeVries (born July 27, 1982) is an American professional basketball player. He played college basketball for Portland State and New Mexico.

Portland State Career 

A Guard who transferred from Portland State after the 2002 fall semester. Played in five games at Portland State in the fall of 2002, costing him the entire 2002–03 year of eligibility. Finished as one of the top 3-pt and FG shooters in MWC history. Career 3-pt average of 45.0% is the highest mark in UNM history. His 48.0* career accuracy in MWC games is the highest in MWC history. 147 career 3-pt FGs is tied with Lamont Long for eighth place in UNM history. Hit a 3-pt in 29 consecutive games, the second longest streak in UNM history.

2001–02 Freshman Season (Portland State)
Devries saw action in 27 games with six starts and averaged 4.7 ppg and 1.1 assists as a freshman and hit 41.2% of 3-point attempts and was named Academic All-Big Sky.

2002–03 Sophomore Season (Portland State)
Played in five games at Portland State, averaged 11.8 ppg and 4.2 rpg but sat out the second semester after transferring to UNM.

University of New Mexico career

2003–04 Junior Season
Named honorable mention All-MWC for the 2003–04 season. Started 21 of 22 games after making his debut against Coppin State on 12–21–03, Averaged 10.7 ppg, 2.9 rpg and 2.95 apg, Shot 44.4% from the field and 44.6% from 3-pt range is 6th all-time for a season at UNM and would have ranked 14th in the NCAA had he made one more 3-pt to qualify.

2004–05 Senior Season
Named 3rd Team All-MWC after shooting 45.1% from 3-pt. range, ranking third in the league and fifth highest mark in school history also earned CoSIDA Academic All-District VI honors and MWC Scholar Athlete recognition, MVP of the 2004 Cmcast Lobo Invitational after scoring 49 points on 16–24 shooting, 13–20 from 3-pt range, in the two-game event and made 93 3-pt which is the fourth most in a season at UNM, Averaged 11.0 ppg, 2.4 rpg and 2.5 apg, Was ninth in the NCAA in 3-pt led the MWC with 2.82 3-pt per-game and ranked 38th in the NCAA, Shot 51.3% from 3-pt range in MWC play, the third highest mark in MWC history .

Professional career

NBL

Joined the West Sydney Razorbacks of the NBL in Australia prior to the 2007/08 season as an import player. DeVries was influential in getting the Razorbacks off the bottom of the ladder. He was in the top 20 in the league for 3-pt %, finishing with final statistics of 17.7 ppg, 2.3 assists per game, 2.3 rebounds per game, 44% 3PT, 45% FG, 75.5% FT, averaging 27.8 minutes per game.

DeVries won the 2007–08 NBL All Star Three Point Shootout, beating out Kirk Penney in the finals.

Tied the NBL single game record going a perfect 8–8 from 3PT.

D-League
On October 30, DeVries was acquired by the Los Angeles D-Fenders.

References

External links
 West Sydney Razorbacks Player Profiles
 CB Lleida's profile

1982 births
Living people
Adelaide 36ers players
Australian people of American descent
Basketball players from Washington (state)
Bàsquet Manresa players
BG Karlsruhe players
CB Girona players
Baloncesto Málaga players
FC Porto basketball players
Liga ACB players
Los Angeles D-Fenders players
Melilla Baloncesto players
New Mexico Lobos men's basketball players
People from Mount Vernon, Washington
Portland State Vikings men's basketball players
Shooting guards
West Sydney Razorbacks players
American men's basketball players